WO2 John Thomas Morris  MM (17 October 1931 - 10 March 2015) was a British Army soldier of the Royal Leicestershire Regiment who won the Military Medal in Korea in 1951 in an action against the Chinese at Maryang San.

References 

1931 births
2015 deaths
British Army personnel of the Korean War
Recipients of the Military Medal
Royal Leicestershire Regiment soldiers
People from Brighton